The Henry Morse House is a historic house located at 32 Cedar Street in Taunton, Massachusetts.

Description and history 
It is a -story, wood-framed building, with a hipped roof and clapboard siding. Projecting bays are found at the front and side, and the front porch is supported by turned posts. The Queen Anne style house was built in 1882 on land that Henry Morse acquired from his father Lovett's estate after his death in 1880. The house is nearly identical in plan to the W.C. Beattie House in Taunton.

It was added to the National Register of Historic Places on July 5, 1984.

See also
National Register of Historic Places listings in Taunton, Massachusetts

References

National Register of Historic Places in Taunton, Massachusetts
Houses in Taunton, Massachusetts
Houses on the National Register of Historic Places in Bristol County, Massachusetts
Queen Anne architecture in Massachusetts
Houses completed in 1882